A ballistic missile is a type of missile that uses projectile motion to deliver warheads on a target. These weapons are powered only during relatively brief periods—most of the flight is unpowered. Short-range ballistic missiles stay within the Earth's atmosphere, while intercontinental ballistic missiles (ICBMs) are launched on a sub-orbital flight.

These weapons are in a distinct category from cruise missiles, which are aerodynamically guided in powered flight.  Unlike cruise missiles, which are restricted to the atmosphere, it is advantageous for ballistic missiles to avoid the denser parts of the atmosphere and they may travel above the atmosphere into outer space.

History 

The earliest form of ballistic missile dates from the 13th century with its use derived from the history of rockets. In the 14th century, the Ming Chinese navy used an early form of a ballistic missile weapon called the Huolongchushui in naval battles against enemy ships. 

One modern pioneer ballistic missile was the A-4, commonly known as the V-2 developed by Nazi Germany in the 1930s and 1940s under the direction of Wernher von Braun. The first successful launch of a V-2 was on October 3, 1942, and it began operation on September 6, 1944, against Paris, followed by an attack on London two days later. By the end of World War II in Europe in May 1945, more than 3,000 V-2s had been launched.

The R-7 Semyorka was the first intercontinental ballistic missile.

Flight 

An intercontinental ballistic missile trajectory consists of three parts: the powered flight portion; the free-flight portion, which constitutes most of the flight time; and the re-entry phase, where the missile re-enters the Earth's atmosphere. The flight phases for shorter-range ballistic missiles are essentially the first two phases of the ICBM, as some ballistic categories do not leave the atmosphere.

Ballistic missiles can be launched from fixed sites or mobile launchers, including vehicles (e.g., transporter erector launchers), aircraft, ships, and submarines. The powered flight portion can last from a few tenths of seconds to several minutes and can consist of multiple rocket stages.

When the fuel is exhausted, no more thrust is provided and the missile enters free flight.

The re-entry stage begins at an altitude where atmospheric drag plays a significant part in missile trajectory, and lasts until missile impact.

Types 

Ballistic missiles vary widely in range and use, and are often divided into categories based on range. Various schemes are used by different countries to categorize the ranges of ballistic missiles:

Air-launched ballistic missile (ALBM)
Tactical ballistic missile: Range between about 
Theatre ballistic missile (TBM): Range between 
Short-range ballistic missile (SRBM): Range between 
Medium-range ballistic missile (MRBM): Range between 
Intermediate-range ballistic missile (IRBM) or long-range ballistic missile (LRBM): Range between 
Intercontinental ballistic missile (ICBM): Range greater than 
Submarine-launched ballistic missile (SLBM): Launched from ballistic missile submarines (SSBNs)

Most current designs have intercontinental range with a notable exception of Indian operational SLBM Sagarika and K-4 as well as North Korea's currently operationally deployed KN-11 which might not have intercontinental range. A comparable missile would be the decommissioned China's JL-1 SLBM with a range of less than 2,500 km.

Tactical short- and medium-range missiles are often collectively referred to as tactical and theatre ballistic missiles, respectively. Long- and medium-range ballistic missiles are generally designed to deliver nuclear weapons because their payload is too limited for conventional explosives to be cost-effective in comparison to conventional bomber aircraft (though the U.S. is evaluating the idea of a conventionally armed ICBM for near-instant global air strike capability, despite the high costs).

Quasi-ballistic missiles 

A quasi-ballistic missile (also called a semi-ballistic missile) is a category of missile that has a low trajectory and/or is largely ballistic but can perform maneuvers in flight or make unexpected changes in direction and range. They include anti-ship ballistic missiles. At a lower trajectory than a ballistic missile, a quasi-ballistic missile can maintain higher speed, thus allowing its target less time to react to the attack, at the cost of reduced range.

The Russian Iskander is a quasi-ballistic missile. The Russian Iskander-M cruises at hypersonic speed of 2,100–2,600 m/s (Mach 6–7) at a height of 50 km. The Iskander-M weighs 4,615 kg, carries a warhead of 710–800 kg, has a range of 480 km and achieves a CEP of 5–7 meters. During flight it can maneuver at different altitudes and trajectories to evade anti-ballistic missiles.

List of quasi-ballistic missiles 

Shaurya (active)
Pralay (under development)

\
 Iskander (active)

Hypersonic ballistic missile 

Many ballistic missiles reach hypersonic speeds (i.e. Mach 5 and above) when they re-enter the atmosphere from space. However, in common military terminology, the term "hypersonic ballistic missile" is generally only given to those that can be maneuvered before hitting their target and don’t follow a simple ballistic trajectory.

Throw-weight 

Throw-weight is a measure of the effective weight of ballistic missile payloads. It is measured in kilograms or tonnes. Throw-weight equals the total weight of a missile's warheads, reentry vehicles, self-contained dispensing mechanisms, penetration aids, and missile guidance systems: generally all components except for the launch rocket booster and launch fuel. Throw-weight may refer to any type of warhead, but in normal modern usage, it refers almost exclusively to nuclear or thermonuclear payloads. It was once also a consideration in the design of naval ships and the number and size of their guns.

Throw-weight was used as a criterion in classifying different types of missiles during Strategic Arms Limitation Talks between the Soviet Union and the United States. The term became politically controversial during debates over the arms control accord, as critics of the treaty alleged that Soviet missiles were able to carry larger payloads and so enabled the Soviets to maintain higher throw-weight than an American force with a roughly comparable number of lower-payload missiles.

Depressed trajectory 

Throw-weight is normally calculated using an optimal ballistic trajectory from one point on the surface of the Earth to another. An optimal trajectory maximizes the total payload (throw-weight) using the available impulse of the missile. By reducing the payload weight, different trajectories can be selected, which can either increase the nominal range or decrease the total time in flight.

A depressed trajectory is non-optimal, as a lower and flatter trajectory takes less time between launch and impact but has a lower throw-weight. The primary reasons to choose a depressed trajectory are to evade anti-ballistic missile systems by reducing the time available to shoot down the attacking vehicle (especially during the vulnerable burn-phase against space-based ABM systems) or a nuclear first-strike scenario. An alternate, non-military purpose for a depressed trajectory is in conjunction with the spaceplane concept with use of air-breathing engines, which requires the ballistic missile to remain low enough inside the atmosphere for air-breathing engines to function.

Combat use 
The following ballistic missiles have been used in combat:

 9K720 Iskander
 Ababil-100
 Al-Samoud 2
 DF-12
 Fateh-110
 LORA
 MGM-140 ATACMS
 OTR-21 Tochka
 Qaher-1/2M
 Scud types
 V-2
 Zolfaghar

See also 
Ballistic missile flight phases
Missile (guided)
MIRV
NATO reporting name (has lists of various Soviet missiles)
Surface-to-surface missile
Weapons of mass destruction
List of currently active missiles of the United States military
List of ICBMs
List of missiles
List of missiles by nation
List of NATO reporting names for ballistic missile submarines

Notes

References 

Needham, Joseph (1986). Science and Civilization in China: Volume 5, Chemistry and Chemical Technology, Part 7, Military Technology; the Gunpowder Epic. Taipei: Caves Books.

Further reading

External links 
Missile Threat: A Project of the Center for Strategic and International Studies

 
Chinese inventions
German inventions of the Nazi period
Wernher von Braun